Pir Hadi Hassan Bux Shah Jilani, commonly known by the title Hadi ("The Guider") (1846–1900), was a Sufi saint and poet from Sanghar in modern-day Pakistan who belonged to Qadiriyya Sufi order. He was born at Dargah Bhuro Bhawan Shah Jilani near Hyderabad, Sindh and lived most of his life in Duthro Sharif Sanghar Sindh after traveling through Sindh to spread Islam and Sufism. He wrote his poetry in many languages, mostly in Sindhi but also in Urdu, Persian and other languages. The annual Urs of Hadi take place in the month of Jumada al-Awwal in Duthro Sharif Sanghar.

Name
He was named by his parents Hassan Bux Shah. After spiritual changes in his life, he is referred to by his devotees and followers as Pir Hadi Hassan Bux Shah Jilani, Hadi Sain, or Murshid Hadi. "Hadi" means "The Guider".

Early life
He was born in the year of 1846 (1262 A.H) in a small village known as Dargah Bhuro Bhawan Shah Jilani near Buxo Laghari, Hyderabad, Sind, British India (nowadays Sindh, Pakistan). After a few years he came under the supervision of his grandfather Subhan Ali Shah Jilani and migrated with him to near Duthro Sharif in a newly constructed village built by his grandfather and named Subhan Ali Shah Jilani.

Family background
Hadi was from a lineage that goes back from Abdul Qadir Gilani to Imam Hassan, who was the son of Ali and was the grandson of Muhammad. His family had many saints and spiritual leaders such as Abdul Malik Shah Jilani (India), who was the Murshid of Sufi Shah Inayat Shaheed, Bhuro Bhawan Shah Jilani, Juman Shah Jilani, Subhan Ali Shah Jilani, wado Kamil Shah Jilani, Ali Bux Shah Jilani, Kamil Shah Sarkar Jilani, Dinal Shah Jilani and many others.

Education
Hadi spent his early life at Dargah Bhuro Bhawan Shah Jilani, his place of birth. After some time, he migrated to Sanghar and settled down near Duthro Sarif at his grandfather's village, known as Subhan Ali Shah Jilani, where he pursued the study of the Quran, Hadiths and Sunnah at Pir-Jo-Midrso under the supervision of his grandfather.

Death
Hadi died on 2 September 1900 AD (Jumada al-Awwal 7, 1318 A.H.) at the age of 56 years.

Dargah Sharif

Hadi's body was entombed in a shrine at Pir Subhan Ali Shah Jilani, which is known as Dargah Pir Hadi Hassan Bux Shah Jilani or Dargah Jilani Duthro Sharif.
The foundation of Dargah Sharif was settled down by Pir Hadi Hassan Bux Shah Jilani. Hadi was actually contracting an Otaq for himself but after martyred his body was buried in his Otaq. Recently, with the help of Shahid Abdul Salam Thahim, Syed Ghulam Shah Jilani and MPA Faraz dero of the Sindh government have constructed a new mosque and Musafir Khana for pilgrims.

Urs

Dargah Sharif on the occasion of   122nd Urs
The annual celebration of Urs begins in the evening of 6-10 Jumada_al-awwal. Thousands of followers, devotees, pilgrims and lovers come from all over Sindh to attend it.

References

Mystic poets
Sufi poets
Sufi mystics
Sufism in Sindh
Sindhi Sufi saints
Sindhi-language poets
Sindhi people
History of Sindh
Sindhi-language writers
Shrines in Pakistan
Sufi shrines
Islamic shrines by country
Religious buildings and structures in Pakistan
18th-century Muslim scholars of Islam
Hanbalis
Hashemite people
1846 births
1900 deaths
Hasanids
People from Sanghar District
Islamic philosophers
Muslim reformers